Milanese is a surname. Notable people with the surname include:

 Alessandro Milanese, Italian motorcycle speedway rider
 Antonio Milanese (1912 – ?), Italian triple jumper
 Gaetano Milanesi (1813–1895), Italian art historian
 Mauro Milanese (born 1971), Italian professional footballer
 Rob Milanese (born 1980), American football wide receiver

Italian-language surnames
Italian toponymic surnames